Wax were a new wave duo in Manchester, England, consisting of American singer-songwriter Andrew Gold and 10cc guitarist/bassist Graham Gouldman. They are best known for their European hit singles "Bridge to Your Heart" and "Right Between the Eyes". In the US, they were listed as Wax UK, while later releases were additionally credited as Andrew Gold & Graham Gouldman.

History

Premise 

In 1981, 10cc was working on what would become the album Ten Out of 10. Andrew Gold was invited to record with the band by Lenny Waronker, head of A&R at Warner Bros, and played keyboards and percussion on the completed album, as well as adding background vocals. The U.S. release of Ten Out of 10 also featured three songs co-written by Gold: "Power of Love," "Runaway" and "We’ve Heard It All Before". It led to an offer to join the band – an offer Gold declined because of other commitments.

Initial work
After 10cc split in 1983, Graham Gouldman persuaded Gold to visit him at his home in Mottram St Andrew, England, to write and spend some time together. Gold ended up staying for seven months. During this period, they wrote enough songs for an album. They chose World in Action as the band name and released a single, "Don't Break My Heart." Soon afterwards, they changed the name of the collaboration to Common Knowledge and later pressings of the debut single went under the new name. A second single, "Victoria", was released, but both singles failed to get any attention, and the album was shelved.

Under the supervision of Harvey Lisberg, Gouldman's long-time manager, the pair started working on songs for a new album, and took the name Wax. They signed with RCA Records, and released three studio albums between 1986 and 1989. The band's best known singles during that period were "Right Between the Eyes" and "Bridge to Your Heart". with the latter being a European hit which was supported by European TV appearances including performances of the song on the renowned, high-profile British pop-music showcase Top of the Pops and the German series Peter's Pop Show.

The band's third album, A Hundred Thousand in Fresh Notes, failed to achieve the level of success of its predecessor and both Gold and Gouldman went on to continue with other ventures.

Break
In the beginning of 1990, Gouldman was offered the chance to reform 10cc with Eric Stewart. They got back together to record the group's comeback album ...Meanwhile, on which Andrew Gold also appeared, adding guitar to the track "Charity Begins at Home". Andrew Gold himself re-formed Bryndle with its original members to record their self-titled debut album.

Gouldman and Stewart continued as 10cc and their next album, Mirror Mirror, also featured Gold. His contributions were backing vocals on "Grow Old With Me" and lead vocals on "Ready to Go Home," the latter co-written by Gold and Gouldman. Despite Gold not being an official member of 10cc, the band still released "Ready to Go Home" with his lead vocals.

Later work
After 10cc's second split, Andrew Gold and Graham Gouldman continued to work together both as Wax and on each other's solo records. First new Wax material resulted in The Wax Files compilation album released in 1997, putting together six new songs, two previously unreleased Common Knowledge tracks, and already released material from the 1980s.

In 1998, their Common Knowledge album was finally released as Common Knowledge.com, with several new tracks, under the Wax name.

A collection of out-takes and rarities, Bikini, was released in 2000.

The first band's live album was released in 2019.

Discography

Studio albums

Live albums

Compilation albums

Box Sets

Singles

Music videos

Other Gold-Gouldman collaborations

References

External links

 Wax at Discogs
 Wax at Harvey Lisberg

British pop music duos
New wave duos
Male musical duos
Musical groups from Manchester
English new wave musical groups
Musical groups established in 1983
Musical groups disestablished in 1990
RCA Records artists
Cherry Red Records artists